This is a list of the sonatas of Wolfgang Amadeus Mozart. For the complete list of compositions, see List of compositions by Wolfgang Amadeus Mozart.

This is a list of sonatas by Wolfgang Amadeus Mozart.

 Piano sonatas 
 Solo piano 
 Piano Sonata No. 1 in C major, K. 279 (Munich, Autumn 1774)
 Piano Sonata No. 2 in F major, K. 280 (Munich, Autumn 1774)
 Piano Sonata No. 3 in B-flat major, K. 281 (Munich, Autumn 1774)
 Piano Sonata No. 4 in E-flat major, K. 282 (Munich, Autumn 1774)
 Piano Sonata No. 5 in G major, K. 283 (Munich, Autumn 1774)
 Piano Sonata No. 6 in D major, K. 284 (Munich, February–March 1775)
 Piano Sonata No. 7 in C major, K. 309 (Mannheim, Nov. 8 1777)
 Piano Sonata No. 8 in A minor, K. 310 (Paris, Summer 1778)
 Piano Sonata No. 9 in D major, K. 311 (Mannheim, November–December 1778)
 Piano Sonata No. 10 in C major, K. 330 (Vienna or Salzburg, 1783)
 Piano Sonata No. 11 in A major, K. 331 (Vienna or Salzburg, 1783)
 Piano Sonata No. 12 in F major, K. 332 (Vienna or Salzburg, 1783)
 Piano Sonata No. 13 in B-flat major, K. 333 (Linz, 1783)
 Piano Sonata No. 14 in C minor, K. 457 (Vienna, Oct. 14, 1784)
 Piano Sonata No. 15 in F major, K. 533/494 (Vienna, Jan. 3, 1788)
 Piano Sonata No. 16 in C major, K. 545 (so-called facile or semplice'' sonata; Vienna, Jun. 26, 1788)
 Piano Sonata No. 17 in B-flat major, K. 570 (Vienna, February, 1789)
 Piano Sonata No. 18 in D major, K. 576 (Vienna, July 1789)

Piano four-hands
 Sonata for Keyboard Four-hands in C major, K. 19d (doubtful) (London, May 1765)
 Sonata for Keyboard Four-hands in D major, K. 381 / 123a
 Sonata for Keyboard Four-hands in B-flat major, K. 358 / 186c
 Sonata for Keyboard Four-hands in F major, K. 497
 Sonata for Keyboard Four-hands in C major, K. 521
 Sonata for Keyboard Four-hands in G major, K. 357 (incomplete)

Two pianos
 Sonata for Two Pianos in D major, K. 448 / 375a (1781)

Violin sonatas

Childhood violin sonatas (1762–66) 
Violin Sonatas, KV 6–9 (1762-64)
Sonata in C for Keyboard and Violin, K. 6 (1762-64)
Sonata in D for Keyboard and Violin, K. 7 (1763-64)
Sonata in B-flat for Keyboard and Violin, K. 8 (1763-64)
Sonata in G for Keyboard and Violin, K. 9 (1764)
Violin Sonatas, KV 10–15 (1764)
Sonata in B-flat for Keyboard, Violoncello and Violin (or Flute), K. 10 (1764)
Sonata in G for Keyboard, Violoncello and Violin (or Flute), K. 11 (1764)
Sonata in A for Keyboard, Violoncello and Violin (or Flute), K. 12 (1764)
Sonata in F for Keyboard, Violoncello and Violin (or Flute), K. 13 (1764)
Sonata in C for Keyboard, Violoncello and Violin (or Flute), K. 14 (1764)
Sonata in B-flat for Keyboard, Violoncello and Violin (or Flute), K. 15 (1764)
Violin Sonatas, KV 26–31 (1766)
Sonata in E-flat for Keyboard and Violin, K. 26 (1766)
Sonata in G for Keyboard and Violin, K. 27 (1766)
Sonata in C for Keyboard and Violin, K. 28 (1766)
Sonata in D for Keyboard and Violin, K. 29 (1766)
Sonata in F for Keyboard and Violin, K. 30 (1766)
Sonata in B-flat for Keyboard and Violin, K. 31 (1766)

Mature violin sonatas (1778–88) 
 Violin Sonata No. 17 in C major, K. 296 (1778)
 Violin Sonata No. 18 in G major, K. 301/293a (1778)
 Violin Sonata No. 19 in E-flat major, K. 302/293b (1778)
 Violin Sonata No. 20 in C major, K. 303/293c (1778)
 Violin Sonata No. 21 in E minor, K. 304/300c (1778)
 Violin Sonata No. 22 in A major, K. 305/293d (1778)
 Violin Sonata No. 23 in D major, K. 306/300l (1778)
 Violin Sonata No. 24 in F major, K. 376/374d (1781)
 Violin Sonata No. 25 in F major, K. 377/374e (1781)
 Violin Sonata No. 26 in B-flat major, K. 378/317d (1779)
 Violin Sonata No. 27 in G major, K. 379/373a (1781)
 Violin Sonata No. 28 in E-flat major, K. 380/374f (1781)
 Violin Sonata No. 29 in A major, K. 402/385e -2 movements (incomplete)- (1782, completed by Maximilian Stadler)
 Violin Sonata No. 30 in C major, K. 403/385c -3 movements (incomplete)- (1782, completed by Maximilian Stadler)
 Violin Sonata No. 31 in C major, K. 404/385d -2 movements (1782, incomplete)-
 Violin Sonata No. 32 in B-flat major, K. 454 (1784)
 Violin Sonata No. 33 in E-flat major, K. 481 (1785)
 Violin Sonata No. 35 in A major, K. 526 (1787)
 Violin Sonata No. 36 in F major, K. 547 (1788)
 Violin Sonata in B-flat major, K. 372 -1 movement: Allegro (incomplete)- (1781, completed by Maximilian Stadler)

Church sonatas 

 Church Sonata No. 1 in E-flat, K. 41h (1772)
 Church Sonata No. 2 in B-flat, K. 68 (1772)
 Church Sonata No. 3 in D, K. 69 (1772)
 Church Sonata No. 4 in D, K. 144 (1774)
 Church Sonata No. 5 in F, K. 145 (1774)
 Church Sonata No. 6 in B-flat, K. 212 (1775)
 Church Sonata No. 7 in F, K. 241a (1776)
 Church Sonata No. 8 in A, K. 241b (1776)
 Church Sonata No. 9 in G, K. 241 (1776)
 Church Sonata No. 10 in F, K. 244 (1776)
 Church Sonata No. 11 in D, K. 245 (1776)
 Church Sonata No. 12 in C, K. 263 (1776)
 Church Sonata No. 13 in G, K. 274 (1777)
 Church Sonata No. 14 in C, K. 278 (1777)
 Church Sonata No. 15 in C, K. 328 (1779)
 Church Sonata No. 16 in C, K. 329 (1779)
 Church Sonata No. 17 in C, K. 336 (1780)

Other sonatas
 Sonata for Bassoon and Violoncello in B-flat major, K. 292 (1775)

See also
 List of compositions by Wolfgang Amadeus Mozart
 List of solo piano compositions by Wolfgang Amadeus Mozart
 List of concert arias, songs and canons by Wolfgang Amadeus Mozart
 Köchel catalogue
 Mozart symphonies of spurious or doubtful authenticity
 The Complete Mozart Edition
 Fantasia No. 4 (Mozart)

References

Sonatas